Prototheora biserrata is a species of moth of the family Prototheoridae. It is found in South Africa, where it known from only one and possibly two localities in the southern Cape Province. The holotype was collected in the wet, temperate Groenkop forest near George. A second specimen, possibly the female of the same species, was found at Camps Bay, a coastal fynbos habitat immediately south of Cape Town.

The wingspan is about 18 mm. Adults have been recorded in early March.

Etymology
The specific epithet is derived from the Latin bi (meaning two, double) and serratus (meaning toothed like a saw, serrate) and refers to the doubly serrated upper and lower margins of the pseudoteguminal arms in the male genitalia.

References

Endemic moths of South Africa
Hepialoidea
Moths of Africa
Moths described in 1996
Taxa named by Donald R. Davis (entomologist)